Back to the Wharf is a Chinese film directed by Li Xiaofeng. This was the third major film created by this director.

Brandon Yu of The New York Times described it as "an allegory about China’s head-spinning modernization." The Houston Chronicle described the film as "Chinese noir".

Plot
The initial portion of the film takes place circa 1992. Song Hao had committed homicide with his father when he was a teenager. Song Hao leaves town and works in Guangzhou.

The bulk of the film takes place in 2007. Song Hao deals with his past after his mother's death as Song Hao comes back to where he grew up. Song Hao also becomes re-acquainted with his friend Li Tang, who became politically powerful in the town; Li Tang had taken a direct admission to university placement because the principal of Li Tang's secondary school sought to get political gain from Li Tang's father, who is the mayor. That spot had been supposed to go to Song Hao. Li Tang, now in a privileged position, is trying to force Wan Xiaoning, the daughter of Song Hao's victim, out of her nail house. Meanwhile, Song Hao's childhood schoolmate, Pan Xiaoshuang, pursues him romantically and the two marry.

Li Tang reminds Song Hao that he knows about Song Hao's crime as he murders Xiaoning by hitting her with the car; he orders Song Hao to bury the body. Song Hao's father tells the man, now with a wife and child, that he needs to endure, but Song Hao breaks down and fatally injures himself. The crimes of the other parties are exposed.

Cast
  - Song Hao (adult)
 Lee Hong-chi - Li Tang (adult)
 Song Jia - Pan Xiaoshuang
 Deng Enxi - Wan Xiaoning
  - Song Jianfei
 Chen Jin - Song Hao's mother
 Zhou Zhengjie - Young Song Hao
 Gao Yuhang - Young Li Tang
 Zhang Jianya - Mr. Zhang, the school principal/headmaster

Reception
Yu praised the acting and the romantic portions as well as the "striking cinematography", while he criticized the "dissonance" that resulted from a conflict between the "rough-edged execution" and the "self-serious attitude".

Wendy Ide of Screen Daily wrote that the film had a "striking visual impact".

Richard Kuipers of Variety wrote that the work is "technically excellent" and "Well paced and moodily shot".

References

External links

 
 
 

2020 films
Chinese neo-noir films
Chinese crime films
2020s crime films